Laura M. Ashton (née Allen) is a Canadian executive based in Singapore. She is the co-founder and CEO of Low Carbon Advisors, an advisory firm headquartered in Singapore that helps companies, governments and investors around the world navigate the path to net zero. She founded Xunama, a business development and marketing consultancy for professional services firms, in July 2018. 

Ashton has been the chair of the Advisory Board of New-Zealand-based, pan-Asian digital learning and development firm, Capability Group since December 2020.

She served as an independent non-executive director and Chair of the Remuneration and Nominating Committee on the Board of Asia Pacific Digital, an Australian Stock Exchange-listed digital services firm from August 2015 until October, 2017. Asia Pacific Digital was subsequently acquired by Trimantium GrowthOps in August 2018. Ashton was the Singapore recipient of a full scholarship for the Australian Institute of Company Directors International Directors course. She successfully completed the diploma program in 2019. She is a member of the Singapore Institute of Directors.

She was the Asia Pacific Director of Business Development, Marketing & Communications 
for Baker McKenzie, an international law firm, from 2016 to 2019.

From 2014 until 2015, she was Asia Pacific Regional Marketing Leader at A.T. Kearney, a management consulting firm.

From August 2011 until December 2013, she was Vice President, Head of Marketing for Philips Lighting's Growth Markets unit.

 She was formerly senior vice president for marketing in Asia-Pacific for Electrolux, as well as president of Electrolux India. Prior to that, she worked in global and regional roles for Shell plc in the Netherlands, England and Singapore.

In 2013, The Internationalist, a magazine for advertising and marketing personnel, named Ashton to its Asia 50 list of 50 "pioneering marketers working in one of the world's most diverse and fastest-growing regions who influence activities from Japan to India."

In November, 2018 she was involved in coaching and training North Korean scientists in entrepreneurial skills in Pyongsong. 

She frequently speaks at public events, including the 2018 B2B Marketing Leaders Forum in Singapore. Other speaking events in recent years include the 2015 Campaign Asia & Content Marketing Institute conference "Content Marketing Singapore", the 
2013 iMedia Agency Summit 
and ad:tech Singapore 2014.

Ashton has been a judge for Haymarket/Campaign Asia’s “Asia Pacific Agency of the Year Award” including the 2018 edition, and “Asian Brand Marketing Effectiveness Awards”. Ashton is also a member of the Singapore chapter of McGill University's alumni association.

References

External links

Xunama company website

1960s births
Living people
Singaporean business executives
Canadian marketing people
Philips employees
McGill University alumni
Marketing women
People associated with Baker McKenzie
People from Truro, Nova Scotia
Université Laval alumni